Eucosma niveicaput is a species of moth of the family Tortricidae. It is found in China (Shaanxi, Gansu), Japan and the Russian Far East.

References

Moths described in 1900
Eucosmini